Shining Romance is a South Korean daily television drama series starring Lee Jin, Park Yoon-jae and Jo An. It aired on MBC from December 23, 2013 to June 20, 2014 on Mondays to Fridays at 19:15 for 122 episodes.

Plot
"Super mom" Oh Bit-na has been a housewife for five years to her plastic surgeon husband and five-year-old daughter named Yeon-doo. One day, she coincidentally meets her childhood friend, Ha-joon. Ha-joon still remembers his promise to Bit-na that they made in elementary school. Their promise was to grow up and marry with each other. But Chae-ri, who has her heart set for Ha-joon, is jealous of Bit-na and tries to stop Bit-na from marrying with Ha-joon. Chae-ri also tries to stop Bit-na from becoming the best cook in Chunwoongak, where Chae-ri lives, and knowing that Professor Jang (Chae-ri's foster father) is Bit-na's biological father. Bit-na's husband, Byun Tae-shik cheats on Bit-na and has an affair with a con artist named Emma. To marry Emma (mostly for money) Byun Tae-shik tricks Bit-na into an unfair fake divorce. When Ha-joon knows that Bit-na is divorced, he does anything to make her become his girlfriend and soon, become  his wife. Chae-ri and her mother, Kim Ae-sook, try to stop Bit-na but Bit-na, smart and quick-witted, avoids the traps set by them. When the truth about Bit-na being the daughter of Professor Jang gets revealed, Bit-na becomes the owner of Chungwookgak. Kim Ae-sook throws down a big flower pot that was meant for Bit-na, but hit Ae-sook's own daughter, Chae-ri. Therefore, Chae-ri seriously injures her head and starts acting like a five-year old, even calling Bit-na's young daughter "older sister". Ae-sook is arrested for her many crimes, especially for switching Chae-ri and Bit-na when they were babies, twisting their fates. Lee Tae-ri, turns herself into the police for a hit-and-run accident that she caused and killed Bit-na's foster father. The final episode of Shining Romance ends with Yeon-doo in Ha-joon's arms, Bit-na walking along beside them.

Cast
Lee Jin as Oh Bit-na
Park Yoon-jae as Kang Ha-joon
Jo An as Jang Chae-ri
Heo Jung-eun as Byun Yeon-doo
Lee Hwi-hyang as Kim Ae-sook
Hong Yo-seob as Jang Jae-ik
Jeon Yang-ja as Yoon Bok-shim
Kyeon Mi-ri as Lee Tae-ri
Jung Han-yong as Kang Dae-poong
Yoo Min-kyu as Kang Ki-joon
Kwak Ji-min as Oh Yoon-na
Lee Mi-sook as Jung Soon-ok
Kim Soo-yeon as Byun Tae-young
Yoon Mi-ra as Heo Mal-sook
Yoon Hee-seok as Byun Tae-shik
Ji Soo-yeon as Emma Jung
Lee Kye-in as Mr. Oh
Nam Kyung-eup as Nam Soo-chul
Kim Hak-rae as Neighborhood uncle

Ratings

Awards and nominations

References

External links
Shining Romance official MBC website 
Shining Romance at MBC Global Media

MBC TV television dramas
2013 South Korean television series debuts
2014 South Korean television series endings
Korean-language television shows
South Korean romance television series